3/5 is the first album by Les Savy Fav. It was released in 1997 by Self-Starter Foundation.  The LP release came in a pack of shower caps and is fairly difficult to find, sometimes fetching high prices on eBay.  Coincidentally, only three-fifths of the line-up on this album, the band's first, remain in the present day line-up, as drummer Patrick Mahoney was replaced by Harrison Haynes before the group's second album, The Cat and the Cobra, and guitarist Gibb Slife left before the recording of the Emor: Rome Upside Down EP.

Having gone out of print, the album was re-issued in 2006 on the Frenchkiss label, minus the shower caps.

Track listing

Credits 
 Tim Harrington (vocals)
 Gibb Slife (guitar)
 Patrick Mahoney (drums)
 Seth Thom Jabour (guitar)
 Syd Butler (bass guitar)

References 

1997 debut albums
Les Savy Fav albums
Albums produced by James Murphy (electronic musician)